The 1973–74 FIBA European Cup Winners' Cup was the eighth edition of FIBA's 2nd-tier level European-wide professional club basketball competition, contested between national domestic cup champions, running from October 1973, to 4 April 1974. It was contested by 25 teams, one less than in the previous edition.

Crvena zvezda defeated Spartak ZJŠ Brno in the final, held in Udine, to become the first Yugoslav League team to win the competition, after unsuccessful appearances by Crvena zvezda itself, and Jugoplastika, in the two previous finals. On the other hand, it was the last of three Czechoslovak League appearances in the final.

Participants

Preliminary round

|}

First round

|}

*Originally, the Champion of the Israeli Cup was drawn to play against the Turkish Champion, but FIBA cancelled this match and awarded TED Ankara Kolejliler a victory by forfeit (2-0).

Second round

|}

Quarterfinals
The quarterfinals were played with a round-robin system, in which every Two Game series (TGS) constituted as one game for the record.

Semifinals

|}

Final
April 2, Palasport "Primo Carnera", Udine

|}

References

External links 
FIBA European Cup Winner's Cup 1973–74 linguasport.com
FIBA European Cup Winner's Cup 1973–74

Cup
FIBA Saporta Cup